Hassan Lok Sabha (lower house of Parliament) constituency is in Karnataka state in Southern India. The constituency was represented by Former Prime Minister H.D. Deve Gowda from 1991 to 1994, 1998 to 1999 and again from 2004 to 2019. This constituency comprises Hassan district and Kaduru Taluk in Chikmagalur district.

Vidhana Sabha segments
Hassan Lok Sabha constituency currently comprises the following eight Legislative Assembly segments:

Members of Lok Sabha

Election results

2019 Lok Sabha Elections

2014

1999
 G.Putta Swamy Gowda (Congress): 3,98,344 (Won by 1,41,757 votes) 
 H.D.Deve Gowda (Janata Dal (S)) : 2,56,587

1998
 H.D.Deve Gowda (Janata Dal (S)): 336,407
 H.C.Sreekantaiah (INC): 304,753

1996 Elections
 Y N Rudresh Gowda (JD): 313,241
 S M Anand (INC): 232,454

See also
 Hassan Chickmagalur Lok Sabha constituency
 Hassan district
 List of Constituencies of the Lok Sabha

References

External links
Hassan lok sabha constituency election 2019 date and schedule

Lok Sabha constituencies in Karnataka
Hassan district